The Zambia women's national volleyball team represents Zambia in international women's volleyball competitions and friendly matches.

It qualified for the 1995 Women's African Volleyball Championship where it finished 6th.

Beach volleyball
Zambia also features a women's national beach volleyball team.

References
Zambia Volleyball Association

National women's volleyball teams
Volleyball
Volleyball in Zambia
Women's sport in Zambia